The following is a timeline of the history of the city of Garland, Texas, United States.

19th century

 1874 - Duck Creek village founded.
 1878 - Post office established.
 1886 - Gulf, Colorado and Santa Fe Railway begins operating in vicinity of Duck Creek.
 1887
 Fire occurs; settlement relocated slightly northeast.
 Garland News begins publication.
 1888 - Relocated settlement named "Garland" after politician Augustus Hill Garland.
 1890 - Population: 478.
 1891
 Town of Garland incorporated.
 M. Davis Williams becomes mayor.
 1895 - Garland Commercial Club formed.
 1899
 Fire.
 William Sachse cemetery in use (approximate date).

20th century

 1911 - Garland Independent School District established.
 1913 - Travis College Hill area platted.
 1920 - Population: 1,421.
 1927 - May 9: Tornado.
 1933 - Nicholson public library opens.
 1941 - Plaza Theatre in business.
 1950
 Garland Road Drive-In cinema in business.
 Population: 10,251.
 1951 - City of Garland incorporated.
 1968 - Garland Civic Theatre established.
 1970 - Population: 81,437.
 1972 - Richland Community College established in nearby Dallas.
 1973
 Garland Landmark Society active.
 Dallas/Fort Worth Airport begins operating in vicinity of Garland.
 1978 - Garland Symphony Orchestra formed.
 1980 - Population: 138,857.
 1982
 Garland Center for the Performing Arts built.
 Amber University active.
 1986 - KIAB television begins broadcasting.
 1990 - Population: 180,650.
 1997 - City website online (approximate date).
 1999 - KAAM radio on the air.

21st century

 2002 - Downtown Garland (DART station) opens.
 2003
 Hawaiian Falls Garland water park in business.
 Pete Sessions becomes U.S. representative for Texas's newly created 32nd congressional district.
 2005 - Firewheel Town Center (shopping mall) in business.
 2007 - Ronald Jones becomes mayor.
 2010 - Population: 226,876.
 2013 - Douglas Athas becomes mayor.
 2015
 May 3: Curtis Culwell Center attack.
 December: Tornado.

See also
 Garland history
 List of mayors of Garland, Texas
 Timelines of other cities in the North Texas area of Texas: Arlington, Dallas, Denton, Fort Worth, Irving, Plano, Wichita Falls

References

Bibliography

 
 
  1972-

External links

 
 Items related to Garland, Texas, various dates (via Digital Public Library of America)
 
  (Related to local history)

Garland, Texas
Garland